Abhimanyu Dassani (born 21 February 1990) is an Indian actor who works in Hindi films. The son of actress Bhagyashree and Himalay, he made his acting debut in 2018 with the action film Mard Ko Dard Nahi Hota, for which he won Filmfare Award for Best Male Debut.

He has since starred in the 2021 Netflix romantic comedy film Meenakshi Sundareshwar and the 2022 action film Nikamma.

Life and career 

Hailing from Mumbai, Dassani started his career by being an assistant to director Rohan Sippy on Dum Maaro Dum and Nautanki Saala!. He studied at the New York Film Academy and Lee Strasberg Theatre and Film Institute. He also practices martial arts and is trained in taekwondo and karate.

Dassani made his feature film debut with Vasan Bala's action-comedy Mard Ko Dard Nahi Hota. It premiered in the Midnight Madness section of the 2018 Toronto International Film Festival, where it won the People's Choice Award: Midnight Madness. The film was also screened at the 2018 MAMI Film Festival. He performed all the stunts himself and watched several classic action films for days to familiarise himself with the genre. He broke a finger and dislocated his shoulder while filming. Pradeep Menon of Firstpost said "he occupies the screen well" and noted that "his look suits the character of a guy who has not had enough meaningful interactions with the real world".

In 2021, Dassani played the male lead in the romantic-comedy Meenakshi Sundareshwar opposite Sanya Malhotra, which released on Netflix. The film received criticism for its stereotypical representation of Tamil people.

Dassani starred in Nikamma with Shilpa Shetty and Shirley Setia which released on 17 June 2022. He will also star in the comedy-drama Aankh Micholi with an ensemble cast alongside Mrunal Thakur and several others.

Filmography

Films

Music videos

Awards and nominations

References

External links

 

Living people
Indian male film actors
Male actors from Mumbai
Male actors in Hindi cinema
21st-century Indian male actors
Filmfare Awards winners
International Indian Film Academy Awards winners
1990 births
Indian male taekwondo practitioners